The KAFAC Stadium is a multi-purpose stadium in Mungyeong, Korea, used for track and field and association football. It was the main stadium for the 2015 Military World Games and is the home stadium of the Korea Armed Forces Athletic Corps, after which it is named. For the 2015 games it hosted the opening ceremony and both the football and track and field competitions. It has a seating capacity of 10,000.

References

External links
 List of South Korean stadiums

Football venues in South Korea
Sports complexes in South Korea
Sports venues in North Gyeongsang Province